This is a list of state prisons in Nevada operated by the Nevada Department of Corrections. There are no federal prisons in Nevada and this list does not include county jails located in the state of Nevada.

Institutions
 Casa Grande Transitional Housing
 Ely State Prison - Nevada's death row
 High Desert State Prison
 Lovelock Correctional Center
 Nevada State Prison (closed)
 Northern Nevada Correctional Center and Stewart Conservation Camp
 Northern Nevada Transitional Housing
 Southern Desert Correctional Center
 Southern Nevada Correctional Center (closed)
 Florence McClure Women's Correctional Center (previously Southern Nevada Women's Correctional Facility)
 Warm Springs Correctional Center

References

External links 
 Nevada Department of Corrections

 
Nevada
Prisons